The Peugeot HR1 is a concept car that was designed by Peugeot for the 2010 Paris Motor Show. It is a supermini SUV and features an innovative hybrid powertrain. Instead of using a diesel linked to an electric motor like in the Peugeot 3008 and Peugeot 508, it uses a 1.2-litre petrol engine. CAR compared the car’s styling being “sort of like the shrunken Range Rover Evoque.”

Design elements from the car were later used in the Peugeot 2008, which went into production in April 2013. The Lacoste is the HR1’s sister car, and is also a hybrid. The vehicle was also displayed at the 2011 Geneva Motor Show, having been announced the previous month.

References

HR1